Jaylen Bacon (born August 5, 1996) is an American professional track and field athlete specializing in the sprints.

Career
In 2017 he qualified to compete for the United States relay team at the World Championships in London, England after placing 4th at the USA Championships over 100 meters. The team placed second in the  relay with Bacon running the third leg, earning them silver medals. He set his personal best in the  a year later during the NCAA preliminaries, with a time of 9.97 seconds.

Bacon attended Arkansas State University, where he was a member of the track and field team. During his time there he made four NCAA finals, two USA finals, earned a silver medal at the World Championships, and broke the 10-second barrier. After his senior year in 2018 he turned pro, signing with Stellar Athletics management and a sponsorship deal with adidas.

Statistics
Information from World Athletics profile unless otherwise noted.

Personal bests

Seasonal bests

Championship results

NCAA results from Track & Field Results Reporting System.

Notes

References

External links

Jaylen Bacon bio at Arkansas State Red Wolves

Living people
1996 births
People from Eastover, South Carolina
Track and field athletes from South Carolina
American male sprinters
African-American male track and field athletes
World Athletics Championships athletes for the United States
World Athletics Championships medalists
Arkansas State Red Wolves men's track and field athletes
21st-century African-American sportspeople